Pandalus hypsinotus is a crustacean in the Pandalidae family, ordinarily  in length, but large females may reach .

This species attains maturity as a male, and in varying proportions as a female, in the second year, and becomes a female during the third year. Subsequent survival into the fourth year is very low. Female shrimps carry eggs from November to April.

Called humpback shrimp in North America, there a small directed fishery is found in Prince Rupert. where the humpback is held to be the finest eating shrimp of all six species.

Called  Toyama shrimp in Japan, as they are found mainly in Toyama Bay.

References

Crustaceans described in 1851
Caridea